North Zhongshan Road is a station on Shanghai Metro Line 1. It is named after Zhongshan Road, the inner ring-road of Shanghai.

References

Railway stations in China opened in 2004
Line 1, Shanghai Metro
Shanghai Metro stations in Jing'an District
Railway stations in Shanghai